Haichemydidae is an extinct family of turtles that belongs to the superfamily Testudinoidea. Its only genus is Haichemys.

References

Testudinoidea
Extinct turtles